George Gates may refer to:

 George Gates (aviator) (1899–?), World War I flying ace
 George Gates (footballer) (1883–1960), English footballer
 George Augustus Gates (1851–1912), American Congregational minister and university administrator